Interstate 494 (I-494) is an auxiliary Interstate Highway making up part of a beltway of I-94, circling through the southern and western portions of the Minneapolis–Saint Paul metropolitan area in Minnesota. The  road is coupled with I-694 (which circles the northern edge of the Twin Cities metro area) at each end and composes more than half of the major beltway of the region. I-694/I-494 also act as loop routes for I-35E and I-35W.

Route description

The exit numbering of I-494 is unusual in that it begins at the Minnesota River heading westbound (between Eagan and Bloomington) and continues clockwise around the entire beltway, continuing clockwise onto I-694. The last exit east of the Minnesota River is exit 71 to Pilot Knob Road. The first exit west of the river is exit 1A, which grants access to eastbound Minnesota State Highway 5 (MN 5) and Minneapolis–Saint Paul International Airport. The most significant landmark on the length of I-494 is Mall of America, just south of the intersection of I-494 and MN 77.

Legally, the route of I-494 is defined as part of unmarked legislative route 393 in Minnesota Statutes § 161.12(5). I-494 is not marked with this legislative number along the actual highway.

History
Construction on I-494 first began in the late 1950s, and it was finally completed in 1985. With the most recent expansion completed in November 2016 in Plymouth, I-494 is now at least three lanes in each direction for its entire route.

A major reconstruction/widening project of I-494 was completed in late 2006 between US Highway 212 (US 212)/MN 5 in Eden Prairie and Carlson Parkway at Minnetonka–Plymouth. There were plans for up to six lanes in each direction for parts of I-494 in Bloomington, but the majority of the city only sees four lanes and sees five in only two spots: eastbound at the East Bush Lake Road exit and further eastbound at the point where I-494 and MN 5 separate from each other.

Expansion of the Wakota Bridge between Newport and South St. Paul over the Mississippi River was completed in mid-2010. The bridge is named so because it connects Washington and Dakota counties. Near the end of this effort, I-494 was widened from two to three lanes in each direction between Lake Road and I-94 in Woodbury.

Traffic
Since its opening, I-494 has been subjected to numerous traffic problems, both eastbound and westbound. Vehicles usually start to slow down at the US 169 interchange in Bloomington and continues to slow at the interchange with MN 100, at the Bloomington–Edina city line. However, traffic is the worst at the interchange for I-35W, which is located at the Bloomington–Richfield city line. Currently, information about the study is on the City of Bloomington's website, with more information starting to come from the Minnesota Department of Transportation (MnDOT). The plan is scoped between US 169 to the Minneapolis–Saint Paul International Airport. The road sees over 500,000 passengers per day, with it being congested for more than 30 percent of the day. So far, MnDOT has determined to add E-ZPass Minnesota lanes eastbound from France Avenue to MN 77 and westbound from MN 77 to I-35W. They also plan to construct a turbine-style ramp for northbound I-35W from westbound I-494. In an effort to reduce congestion on the highway and on exits as well, MnDOT is planning to close all ramps at Nicollet Avenue and 12th Avenue and construct a full-access interchange at County State-Aid Highway 35 (CSAH 35; Portland Avenue), with two onramps and two offramps to replace the ramps. Problems have been addressed throughout the entire corridor, with all the highways being included. Construction for the Metro Orange Line tunnel began in 2019 and is still currently underway. The rest of the corridor is still being studied, with plans for construction to begin between 2022 and 2024.

494 Corridor Commission
The 494 Corridor Commission, also known as 494 Commuter Services, is a nonprofit organization aimed at reducing traffic congestion along the southwest section of the I-494 corridor. In 1988, the cities of Bloomington, Eden Prairie, Edina, Minnetonka, and Richfield joined to address traffic congestion and work toward improving I-494. The organization's mission is to promote economic growth and regional prosperity through improved transportation options along the highway, such as carpooling and bus transit. The organization's board of directors consists of representatives from each of the five member cities, MnDOT, the Metropolitan Council, and the private business community.

Exit list

References

Adam Froehlig (November 22, 2003). Interstate Highway 494. Interstate 494 in Minnesota. Accessed August 26, 2010.
Interstate 494 Minnesota. Interstate-Guide.com. Accessed May 17, 2005.

External links
MnDOT: MnDOT I-494 Reconstruction Project - from I-394 to Minnesota River

 
Interstate Highways in Minnesota
Auxiliary Interstate Highways
Interstate 94-4
Interstate 94-4
Interstate 94-4
494